Stina Aronson (1892–1956) was a Swedish writer. Considered a modernist, she gained fame with her novel Hitom himlen (This Side of Heaven) (1946) in which she portrayed women farmers in the north of Sweden.

Bibliography
 En bok om goda grannar, 1921 
 Slumpens myndling, 1922
 Jag ger vika, 1923
 Två herrar blev nöjda, 1928 pseudonym Sara Sand
 Fabeln om Valentin, 1929 pseudonym Sara Sand
 Tolv hav, 1930 pseudonym Sara Sand
 Syskonbädd, 1931 pseudonym Sara Sand
 Feberboken, 1931 pseudonym Mimmi Palm
 Medaljen över Jenny, 1935
 Byar under fjäll, 1937
 Gossen på tröskeln, 1942
 Hitom himlen, 1946
 Sång till polstjärnan, 1948
 Kantele, 1949
 Två skådespel, 1949
 Dockdans, 1949
 Den fjärde vägen, 1950
 Sanningslandet, 1952
 Den röda gåvan och andra noveller, 1967

References

Further reading  
 

1892 births
1956 deaths
People from Uppsala
Swedish-language writers
Swedish women novelists
20th-century Swedish novelists
20th-century Swedish women writers